Riverside Garden(s) may refer to:

Yanlord Riverside Garden in Changning District, Shanghai, China
Riverside Gardens, Louisville in United States
Fellows Riverside Gardens, public botanical gardens, Mill Creek Metro Parks system, Youngstown, Ohio
University of California, Riverside Botanic Gardens in United States

or gardens in

Riverside, California
Riverside County, California
Riverside Park (Manhattan), a waterfront public park on Upper West Side of the borough of Manhattan
Riverside, Illinois

or as an alternate name of

Greenfields, Western Australia